was the 100th emperor of Japan, according to the traditional order of succession, and the sixth and final Emperor of the Northern Court.

He is officially considered to have been the Northern pretender from May 24, 1382 to October 21, 1392, when upon Emperor Go-Kameyama's abdication, Go-Komatsu is understood to have been a legitimate emperor (the 100th sovereign) from that date. In 1392, following the post-Nanboku-chō unification of the two formerly contending courts, the Southern Emperor Emperor Go-Kameyama reached an agreement with Go-Komatsu to alternate control of the throne between the Northern and Southern courts on a ten-year plan which effectively signaled the end of the southern court's claims to sovereignty. However, Go-Komatsu reneged, not only ruling for 20 years until his own abdication on October 5, 1412, but was succeeded by his own son, rather than by one from the former Southern Court. According to pre-Meiji scholars, Go-Komatsu's reign as a legitimate emperor spanned the years from 1392 through 1412. The present Japanese Imperial Family is descended from the 
three Northern Court emperors.

This Nanboku-chō "sovereign" was named after the 9th-century Emperor Kōkō, and go- (後), translates literally as "later."  Jien's Gukanshō explains that Kōkō was called "the Emperor of Komatsu".  The 14th-century pretender and emperor may be called the "later Emperor Kōkō" or the "later Emperor Komatsu". The Japanese word go has also been translated to mean the "second one;" and in some older sources, this would-be emperor may be identified as "Komatsu, the second", or as "Komatsu II."

Genealogy

Go-Komatsu was the first son of Emperor Go-En'yū. His mother was Tsūyōmonin no Itsuko (通陽門院厳子), daughter of the Lord Keeper of the Privy Seal Sanjō Kimitada (三条公忠).

 Consort: Hinonishi Motoko (日野西資子, 1384–1440) later Kohan’mon-in (光範門院), Hinonishi Sukekuni's daughter
 First son: Imperial Prince Mihito (実仁親王) later Emperor Shōkō
 Second son: Prince Ogawa (1404–1425; 小川宮), Emperor Shōkō's crown prince
 First daughter: Princess Riei (理永女王; 1406–1447)
Lady-in-waiting: Kanrouji Tsuneko (甘露寺経子), Kanrouji Kanenaga's daughter
Naishi: Hinonishi Sukekuni's daughter
Naishi: Shirakawa Suketada's daughter
Naishi: Kohyōe-no-Tsubone (小兵衛局)
daughter: (b. 1412)
Naishi: Unknown (daughter of a retainer from the Southern Court)
 Ikkyū Sōjun

He was named after Emperor Kōkō, who had the alternate name Komatsu, because they both returned the throne to their families, in the case of Emperor Go-Komatsu, by defeating his Southern Court rivals, and in the case of Emperor Kōkō, by succeeding his elder brother's grandson, Emperor Yōzei.

Events of Go-Komatsu's life
In his own lifetime, Go-Komatsu and those around him believed that he occupied the Chrysanthemum Throne from May 24, 1382 through 1412.

He was raised in the turbulent Nanboku-chō period of rival northern and southern courts in the mansion of Hino Sukenori (日野西資教). He succeeded as Northern Emperor upon the abdication of his father, the Northern Pretender Emperor Go-En'yū. With the help of Ashikaga Yoshimitsu, his father ruled as Cloistered Emperor.

In 1392, an envoy from the Ashikaga Shogunate managed to persuade Emperor Go-Kameyama to convey the Imperial Regalia to Go-Komatsu, which meant that he ceded the Chrysanthemum throne to his former rival. Go-Komatsu received the succession (senso); and he is understood to have formally acceded to the legitimate Imperial power and position (sokui). In the peace at that time, it was agreed that the northern and southern courts would alternate. However, in 1412, when Emperor Go-Komatsu abdicated, the agreement was thrown away, and, instead, he was succeeded by his son, Emperor Shōkō, and all subsequent Emperors were descended from the Northern Court. Until 1911, the Northern Court Emperors were considered the legitimate ones, and the Southern Court to be illegitimate. However, now the Southern Court is considered to have been legitimate, primarily because they retained the three sacred treasures, and thus, Emperor Go-Komatsu is not considered to have been legitimate for the first 10 years of his reign.

He is enshrined with other emperors at the imperial tomb called Fukakusa no kita no misasagi (深草北陵) in Fushimi-ku, Kyoto.

Kugyō
Kugyō (公卿) is a collective term for the very few most powerful men attached to the court of the Emperor of Japan in pre-Meiji eras. Even during those years in which the court's actual influence outside the palace walls was minimal, the hierarchic organization persisted.

In general, this elite group included only three to four men at a time. These were hereditary courtiers whose experience and background would have brought them to the pinnacle of a life's career. During Go-Komatsu's reign, this apex of the Daijō-kan included: 
 Sadaijin
 Udaijin
 Nadaijin
 Dainagon

Eras of Go-Komatsu's reign
The years of Go-Komatsu's Nanboku-chō and post-Nanboku-chō reign are more specifically identified by more than one era name or nengō.

Nanboku-chō northern court
Eras as reckoned by legitimate Court (as determined by Meiji rescript)
 Eitoku        (1381–1384)
 Shitoku       (1384–1387)
 Kakei         (1387–1389)
 Kōō       (1389–1393)

Nanboku-chō southern court
Eras as reckoned by pretender Court (as determined by Meiji rescript)
 Kōwa     (1381–1384)
 Genchū (1384–1390)
 Meitoku       (1390–1393)‡

Post-Nanboku-chō court
Eras merged as Meitoku 3 replaced Genchū 9 as Go-Kameyama abdicated.
 Meitoku       (1393–1394)‡
 Ōei       (1394–1428)

Southern Court rivals
 Chōkei
 Go-Kameyama

See also
 List of Emperors of Japan
 Imperial cult

Notes

References

 Brown, Delmer M. and Ichirō Ishida, eds. (1979).  Gukanshō: The Future and the Past. Berkeley: University of California Press. ; OCLC 251325323
 Ponsonby-Fane, Richard. (1959).  The Imperial House of Japan. Kyoto: Ponsonby Memorial Society. OCLC 194887
 Titsingh, Isaac. (1834). [Siyun-sai Rin-siyo/Hayashi Gahō, 1652], ''Nipon o daï itsi ran (Annales des empereurs du Japon''). Paris: Oriental Translation Fund of Great Britain and Ireland.

Japanese emperors
1377 births
1433 deaths
Emperor Go-Komatsu
Emperor Go-Komatsu
Emperor Go-Komatsu
Emperor Go-Komatsu
Emperor Go-Komatsu
14th-century Japanese monarchs
15th-century Japanese monarchs
Japanese retired emperors
Pretenders